Ek Mahal Ho Sapno Ka is a Hindi language Indian soap opera that aired on Sony TV. It was the first Hindi fiction series to reach 1000 episodes and is one of the longest television serials of Indian television. The show was a remake of Gujarati show on ETV Gujarati called Sapna Na Vavetar.

Plot

The story revolves around the life of a Gujarati business tycoon, Purushottam Nanavati, who is the head of his joint family of four married sons. It focuses on the trials & tribulations that a joint family faces, whether it is due to the family members' separation or their union. In addition, it shows how the family members find ways to cope with these differences.

Cast

 Ajit Vachhani as Purushottam Nanavati
 Dina Pathak as Dadi
 Kalpana Diwan as Anusuya Purushottam Nanavati
 Sanat Vyas as Sanat Purushottam Nanavati
 Zankhana Desai / Meghna Roy as Panna Sanat Nanvati
 Rasik Dave as Shekhar Purushottam Nanavati
 Ragini Shah / Pallavi Pradhan as Rashmi Shekhar Nanvati
 Rajeev Mehta as Sameer Purushottam Nanavati
 Apara Mehta as Parolata Sameer Nanavati
 Manoj Joshi as Abhay Purushottam Nanavati
 Vandana Pathak as Sonal Abhay Nanavati
 Suchita Trivedi as Meenu Purushottam Nanavati (wife of Ketan Dalmiya)
 Supriya Pathak / Sejal Shah as Neelu Purushottam Nanavati
 Sarita Joshi as Sumitra, Rashmi's Mother
 Deven Bhojani as Raju Rajkotwala
 Deepak Gheewala as Parag Dalmiya, Meenu's Father-In-Law
 Rajni Shantaram as Saroj Dalmiya, Meenu's Mother-In-Law
 Shailesh Dave
 Dipesh Shah
 Darshan Jariwala as Vijay Saxeria
 Minal Padiyar a.k.a. Mansi Patel as Beena, Rashmi's Sister, and Mansi Saxeria
 Rita Bhaduri as Faiba
 Paresh Ganatra as Dheeraj , Raju's PA
 Trupti Bhupen
 Muni Jha as Bobby Anand
 Dinyar Contractor
 Vaishali Thakkar as Bharti
 Minal Karpe as Vasanti Ben
 Amita Choksi as Ganga
 Dhruvi Parekh as Riddhi
 Ravisha Parikh as Siddhi
 Dimple Shah as Gautami
Arvind Vaidya as Gautami's father

References

External links
Ek Mahal Ho Sapno Ka Official Site

Indian television soap operas
Sony Entertainment Television original programming
1999 Indian television series debuts
2002 Indian television series endings